Melia Grand Hermitage (Мелия гранд ермитаж in Bulgarian is a 5 stars hotel in Golden Sands, Bulgaria.

Beside its close position to the beach, it is surrounded by the green park.

See also 
List of hotels in Bulgaria

References

External links 
Homepage
Location on Google Maps.

Hotels in Golden Sands
Hotels established in 2005
Hotel buildings completed in 2005